Edwin Howell may refer to:

Edwin C. Howell (1860–1907), American whist and bridge player
Edwin E. Howell (1845–1911), American geologist and cartographer

See also
Edward Howell (disambiguation)